Badenheim is an Ortsgemeinde – a municipality belonging to a Verbandsgemeinde, a kind of collective municipality – in the Mainz-Bingen district in Rhineland-Palatinate, Germany. It belongs to the Verbandsgemeinde of Sprendlingen-Gensingen, whose seat is in Sprendlingen.

Geography

The municipality lies west of Bundesstraße 50 at the northwest outliers of the Rhenish Hesse hills some 10 km east of the town of Bad Kreuznach.

Culture and sightseeing
Badenheim has a Catholic church from the Baroque period as well as an Evangelical church in the Classicist style. Also worth seeing are timber-frame houses and wineries.

References

External links

 Municipality’s official webpage 

Municipalities in Rhineland-Palatinate
Rhenish Hesse
Mainz-Bingen